Face to Face (original title Ballë për Ballë) is a 1979 Albanian drama film directed by Kujtim Çashku and based on a novel by Albanian author Ismail Kadare.

Plot
A translator at the conference of communist parties witnessed the biggest break between the two communist parties. The dramatic events in the military conflict take place on a naval base in Albania, which the Soviets did not dare to adopt.

Cast
Katerina Biga as Jelena Graçova
Rajmonda Bulku as Zana
Thimi Filipi as Xhemal Struga  
Timo Flloko as Inxhinier Sergej  
Arben Imami as Arben Struga  
Bujar Lako as Mujo Bermema  
Sulejman Pitarka as Shelenvi  
Kadri Roshi as Belul Gjinomadhi  
Mevlan Shanaj as Besniku  
Agim Shuke as Komisari i flotës
Stavri Shkurti as Shefi i arkeologjisë
Ilir Bozo as Ushtari rus i plagosur në nëndetë
Lola Gjoka as Plaka Nurihan

References

External links

Albanian-language films
1979 films
1979 drama films
Albanian drama films